In Lushootseed, sammamish is variously translated as meander dwellers or willow people.

Sammamish may refer to:
 Sammamish, Washington
 Lake Sammamish
 Lake Sammamish State Park
 Sammamish River
 Sammamish High School in Bellevue, Washington
 Sammamish people

See also
Samish

References